Sceloporus unicanthalis, the  southwestern bunchgrass lizard, is a species of lizard in the family Phrynosomatidae. It is endemic to Mexico.

References

Sceloporus
Endemic reptiles of Mexico
Reptiles described in 1937
Taxa named by Hobart Muir Smith